Final Battle (2020) was a professional wrestling event produced by American promotion Ring of Honor (ROH). It took place on Thursday December 10, 2020 and aired on tape delay on Friday, December 18 at the UMBC Event Center in Baltimore, Maryland. It was the 19th event under the Final Battle chronology.

This was ROH's only pay-per-view event in 2020, as two previously scheduled events to have taken place in March (ROH 18th Anniversary Show and Supercard of Honor XIV) were cancelled due to the COVID-19 pandemic, with ROH subsequently going on a five month hiatus during the pandemic, and resuming operations in August.

Storylines

The event featured 10 professional wrestling matches, which involve different wrestlers from pre-existing scripted feuds, plots, and storylines that play out on ROH's television programs. Wrestlers portray villains or heroes as they follow a series of events that build tension and culminate in a wrestling match or series of matches.

Results

Notes

References

2020 in professional wrestling
2020 in Maryland
Events in Baltimore
2020
Ring of Honor pay-per-view events
Professional wrestling in Baltimore
December 2020 events in the United States